Bishop of Kyiv can refer to:

Metropolitan of Kiev and all Rus' (988-1685)
 Bishop of Kyiv (Roman Catholic) (since early 14th century)
 The Greek Catholic Metropolitan of Kyiv (1596–1838) or Major Archbishop of Kyiv-Galicia (since 2000)
 The Ukrainian Orthodox Church (Moscow Patriarchate) Metropolitan of Kyiv (since 1685)
 The Orthodox Church of Ukraine Metropolitan of Kyiv (since 2018)
 The Ukrainian Autocephalous Orthodox Church Metropolitan of Kyiv (1921–1936, 1942–1953, 2000–2018) or Patriarch of Kyiv and All Rus-Ukraine (1990–2000)
 The Ukrainian Orthodox Church – Kyiv Patriarchate Patriarch of Kyiv and All Rus-Ukraine (1992–2018)

 Kiev